Parliamentary elections were held in the Maldives in September 1969, the first under the 1968 constitution. The newly elected People's Majlis convened in February 1970.

Background
The Maldives had become independent in 1965. A new constitution was approved in a March 1968 referendum, changing the country from a constitutional monarchy under Sultan Muhammad Fareed Didi into a republic. Prime Minister Ibrahim Nasir was chosen as president by the People's Majlis and then confirmed in a public vote in September 1968.

Electoral system
The 1968 constitution provided for a People's Majlis with 46 elected members and eight appointed by the President. Eight were elected in Malé and two were elected from each of the 19 atolls, which formed two-member constituencies. Voters could vote for only one candidate.

References

Maldives
1969 in the Maldives
Elections in the Maldives
September 1969 events in Asia
Election and referendum articles with incomplete results